The 178th Army Division(2nd Formation) was activated on July 1, 1967 at Chengxihu Farm in Huoqiu, Anhui province.

The division was a part of 60th Army Corps. As its activation the division was a behind-the-enemy-line formation, composing of 4 infantry regiments:
532nd Infantry Regiment (former 543rd);
533rd Infantry Regiment;
534th Infantry Regiment;
538th Infantry Regiment.

The division conducts agricultural construction missions until October 1969, when it was replaced by the activating 73rd Army Division and moved to Suzhou, Jiangsu as a combat alert unit. By that time the division was converted to a field-army formation, and its 538th Infantry Regiment was reorganized as Artillery Regiment, 178th Army Division. Since then the division was composed of:
532nd Infantry Regiment;
533rd Infantry Regiment;
534th Infantry Regiment;
Artillery Regiment.

In September 1985 the division was disbanded. Headquarters, 178th Army Division was converted to Headquarters, Artillery Brigade of 1st Army.

References

中国人民解放军各步兵师沿革，http://blog.sina.com.cn/s/blog_a3f74a990101cp1q.html

Infantry divisions of the People's Liberation Army
Military units and formations established in 1967
Military units and formations disestablished in 1985